Phi Omega Sigma  may refer to the six unrelated student organizations:

Phi Omega Sigma (College of Wooster) at The College of Wooster, Ohio, United States (founded in 1913, de-chartered in 2017)
Phi Omega Sigma Christian Fraternity, Inc., a co-educational fraternity in Missouri State University, United States (founded in 2004)
Phi Omega Sigma, a women's social club in Oklahoma Baptist University, United States
Phi Omega Sigma, nicknamed "Possums", a housing group in Grove City College, Pennsylvania, United States
Phi Omega Sigma, a fraternity founded in University of Puerto Rico at Arecibo (founded in 2000)
Phi Omega Sigma (Philippines), also known as "POSANS", a collegiate social-interest and semi-service fraternity/sorority and an international alumni association (founded in 1968)